WTV is a Bosnian local commercial Cable television channel based in Gračanica, Bosnia and Herzegovina. The program is mainly produced in Bosnian language and it is available in Tuzla Canton.

References

External links 
 www.wtv.ba (Official website)

Television stations in Bosnia and Herzegovina
Television channels and stations established in 2016
Companies of Bosnia and Herzegovina